Christopher Eyles Guy Bowen (born 17 January 1973) is an Australian politician who has been Minister for Climate Change and Energy in the Albanese government since June 2022. He is a member of the Australian Labor Party (ALP) and was first elected to parliament at the 2004 federal election. He held ministerial office in the Rudd and Gillard governments from 2007 to 2013.

Bowen served on the Fairfield City Council from 1995 to 2004, including a term as mayor. He was elected to the House of Representatives in the 2004 election, winning the seat of Prospect; he would later transfer to the seat of McMahon at the 2010 federal election, after his former seat was abolished. Bowen was added to Kevin Rudd's shadow ministry in 2006, and following the ALP's victory at the 2007 election served variously as Assistant Treasurer, Minister for Competition Policy and Consumer Affairs, Financial Services, Superannuation and Corporate Law, and Human Services. After Julia Gillard replaced Rudd as prime minister in June 2010, Bowen was made the Minister Immigration and Citizenship, and also served as the Minister for Tertiary Education, Skills, Science and Research, Small Business for a brief time in 2013. 

In June 2013, Rudd would replace Gillard as prime minister in the final leadership contest between the two, and he would assign Bowen the role of Treasurer. He held this position for less than three months, as the ALP was defeated at the 2013 election. Bowen served briefly as the interim leader of the ALP and acting leader of the opposition. He was the shadow treasurer under Bill Shorten from 2013 to 2019. After the 2019 election, he became a candidate to succeed Shorten as party leader but eventually withdrew in favour of Anthony Albanese.

After the ALP's victory in the 2022 election, Bowen would become the Minister for Climate Change and Energy. He is regarded as a senior figure in the Labor Right faction.

Early years and background
Bowen was born in Sydney to Christine and Ross Bowen. His father worked for the National Roads and Motorists' Association, while his mother, who was born in the United Kingdom, was a childcare worker. Bowen grew up in the suburb of Smithfield, where one of his neighbours was soccer player Harry Kewell. He began his education at Smithfield Public School, and later attended St Johns Park High School before going on to the University of Sydney, where he graduated with a Bachelor of Economics in 1994. One of his tutors was the future Greek finance minister Yanis Varoufakis.

Bowen was elected to Fairfield City Council in 1995 and was Mayor of Fairfield in 1998 and 1999. He was elected president of the Western Sydney Regional Organisation of Councils (WSROC) in 1999 and served as president until 2001.

Political career
In 2004, Bowen was elected to the House of Representatives replacing Janice Crosio after she retired after 25 years in both state and federal politics. In 2006, Bowen was appointed to the Labor front bench as Shadow Assistant Treasurer and Shadow Minister for Revenue and Competition Policy.

Government minister (2007–13)
In December 2007 Prime Minister Kevin Rudd appointed him Assistant Treasurer and Minister for Competition Policy and Consumer Affairs. In June 2009 Bowen was promoted to cabinet as Minister for Financial Services, Superannuation and Corporate Law and Minister for Human Services.

In April 2010 Bowen announced significant reforms to the financial services sector including banning of commissions for financial planners giving advice on retail investment products including superannuation, managed investments and margin loans; instituting a statutory fiduciary duty so that financial advisers must act in the best interests of their clients, and increasing the powers of the corporate regulator; the Australian Securities and Investments Commission. The reforms were partially a response to the high-profile collapse of Storm Financial, Westpoint and Opes Prime and the resultant losses for retail investors, but also reflected global concerns with financial governance following the Global Financial crisis of 2007–2010. The reforms are due to be fully implemented on 1 July 2013.

In September 2010, Bowen was appointed Minister for Immigration and Citizenship, succeeding Senator Chris Evans. On 2 February 2013, Bowen replaced Evans as Minister for Tertiary Education, Skills, Science and Research.  Evans was also Minister for Small Business.

Chris Bowen resigned his ministerial portfolios on 22 March 2013 after he supported an unsuccessful attempt to reinstall Kevin Rudd as Prime Minister.

Following the June 2013 leadership spill, Bowen was reinstated as a Cabinet Minister and given the portfolio of Treasurer. He was sworn in on 27 June 2013. He also has been given responsibility for financial services and superannuation, including carriage of the MySuper and other Simple Super reforms previously held by Bill Shorten.

Opposition (2013–22)
Bowen was appointed Interim Leader of the Labor Party on 13 September 2013 following the resignation of Kevin Rudd in the wake of the party's defeat in the 2013 federal election. Bowen pledged not to stand in the October 2013 leadership spill which was contested by Anthony Albanese and Bill Shorten. Shorten was elected as leader. Bowen was later appointed Shadow Treasurer by Bill Shorten.

After Labor's shock loss in the 2019 federal election, Shorten announced his pending resignation as leader of the party. Bowen was considered a frontrunner to succeed him. On 21 May, Bowen announced his candidacy in the leadership ballot, but withdrew the following day. He was subsequently replaced as Shadow Treasurer by Jim Chalmers, but remained on the frontbench as Shadow Minister for Health.

As Shadow Treasurer after his stint as Treasurer, he was shadow to his three immediate successors as Treasurer, Joe Hockey, Scott Morrison and Josh Frydenberg.

Government minister (2022–)
Following the 2022 federal election, Bowen was appointed Minister for Climate Change and Energy in the Albanese ministry.

Political positions
Bowen supports same-sex marriage. Notably in 2017, his Division of McMahon had the 3rd highest percentage of "No" responses in the Australian Marriage Law Postal Survey, with 64.9% of the electorate's respondents to the survey responding "No".

Bowen supported then Foreign Minister Marise Payne's call for an independent global inquiry into the origins of the COVID-19 pandemic including China's handling of the initial outbreak in Wuhan.

Personal life
Bowen is married to Rebecca Mifsud, who  worked for Toll Holdings as an industrial relations executive. They met at the 2000 ALP National Conference, where Mifsud was a delegate for the Electrical Trades Union. The couple have two children together and they currently reside in Smithfield, Bowen's childhood suburb.

Bowen and his older brother Paul had two siblings who died shortly after being born. Bowen's mother, Christine, lost two baby boys when the family was still living in the UK - once in 1959 and in 1960. Bowen revealed this story in order to raise awareness to the lasting negative effects of stillbirths on families.

Bowen possesses a Diploma of Modern Language (Bahasa Indonesia) from the University of New England.

See also
 Rudd Government (2007–2010)
 Gillard Government
 Rudd Government (2013)
 Albanese Government

Bibliography
 Hearts and Minds: A Blueprint for Modern Labor (2013)
 The Money Men: Australia's Twelve Most Notable Treasurers (2015)
On Charlatans (2021)

References

External links
 Chris Bowen's official website
 
 Profile on the Parliament of Australia website
 Summary of parliamentary voting for Chris Bowen MP on TheyVoteForYou.org.au

|-

|-

|-

|-

|-

|-

|-

|-

|-

|-

 

1973 births
Australian Labor Party members of the Parliament of Australia
Labor Right politicians
Australian Leaders of the Opposition
Gillard Government
Government ministers of Australia
Living people
Members of the Australian House of Representatives for Prospect
Members of the Australian House of Representatives for McMahon
Members of the Cabinet of Australia
Politicians from Sydney
Rudd Government
Treasurers of Australia
University of Sydney alumni
Writers from Sydney
21st-century Australian politicians
Mayors of Fairfield, New South Wales
Albanese Government